Springtime Can Kill You is Jolie Holland's third studio album.  It was released on May 9, 2006 through Anti-.

Track listing 
All songs by Jolie Holland except when specified
 "Crush in the Ghetto" – 3:01
 "Mehitabel's Blues" (Jolie Holland/Brian Miller) – 3:21
 "Springtime Can Kill You" (Jolie Holland/Brian Miller) – 2:48
 "Crazy Dreams" (CR Avery) – 2:22
 "You're Not Satisfied" (adaptation of "Though you're not satisfied" written by Riley Pucket) – 2:09
 "Stubborn Beast" – 4:06
 "Don't Tell 'Em" – 2:29
 "Moonshiner" – 3:32
 "Ghostly Girl" – 3:34
 "Nothing Left to Do but Dream" – 7:24
 "Adieu False Heart" (traditional) – 2:36
 "Mexican Blue" – 6:29

Personnel 
 Jolie Holland – voice, piano, whistle, box fiddle, guitar
 Brian Miller - guitars, piano, percussion, rhodes, electric bass, glockenspiel
 Keith Cary - upright bass, harmony vocals, tuba, lap steel, cello, hawaiian guitar
 David Mihaly - drum kit, tiny bells
 Peter Musselman - french horn, accordion
 Ara Anderson - baritone horn, pump organ
 Feddi Price - mellophone
 Olive Mitra - electric bass
 Sonny Smith - hammond b3 organ
 Carvell Wallace - harmony vocals
 David Dondero - voice
 Kate Klaire - harmony vocals

2006 albums
Jolie Holland albums